The Sony Ericsson K600 is a 3G mobile phone handset manufactured by Sony Ericsson. It was announced in the first quarter of 2005.  The K600i is its international variant. Generally available on the Orange network in the UK, the K600i is very closely related to the K608i and V600i models, and was produced at the same time. The K608i was available on the 3 network, and the V600i was available on the Vodafone network. The K608i and V600i are both practically the same phone internally as the K600i, but look different externally.

Main Features
 Measurement: 104.3mm x 45mm x 18.9mm (4.13" x 1.77" x .79")
 Weight: 105g, 3.7 oz
 1.3 MegaPixel, 1280x1024 pixels (main camera) and front-mounted QCIF (176x144 pixels) camera for video calls
 digital zoom up to 4x and photo light
 triband with GPRS and 3G support
 MP3, MPEG4 playback
 33MB internal memory
 FM Radio with RDS
 Bluetooth and Infrared support
 Java MIDP 2.0

Reviews
The K600 was relatively small for a 3G phone at the time of its manufacture. As the phone doesn't feature a memory card slot, it is mainly criticised for its inability to expand memory. It is usually praised for its connectivity options, it can serve as a modem for a computer either via USB data cable or Bluetooth.

See also
 List of Sony Ericsson products

References

External links
 Sony Ericsson K600i main page

K600
Mobile phones introduced in 2005
Mobile phones with infrared transmitter